American football is a popular sport in North America, and it has been influential and the stepping stone to many players and as National Football League in the United States. Football in North America is played by the same rules as in the United States. In 2010, the island nurtured  twenty-eight players who played in the NFL; a number that has increased each year.

History
Every year the number of high school graduates from American Samoa who go to play college football increases. About ten years ago the University of Hawaii was one of the only college that recruited players from American Samoa, with a few exceptions. Today, schools such as BYU, Arizona, Wisconsin, USC, Stanford, Western Kentucky, UCLA, Cal, Texas Tech, Nevada, Tennessee-Chattanooga, and Washington send assistants to clinics that are held annually on the island. There are several obstacles that discourage coaches from recruiting in American Samoa. One of these is the expense and time that is required to travel to the island. The trip takes approximately fifteen hours from the U.S. mainland. Another obstacle is that the majority of the American Samoan athletes struggle to meet the NCAA academic standards. The majority of athletes grow up in a bilingual household. This becomes a hardship when these students are expected to complete the SAT because the English portion is extremely difficult to be completed due to the language barrier. Some families realize that this might inhibit their son from being able to play at the college level. As a solution to this language problem, some families choose to send their children to another island or to the U.S. proper for high school; they typically send their sons to live with a relative in one of these places.

References

 
Sports in American Samoa